Abdul Yahaya (born 24 April 1990) is a Nigerian basketball player for Abidjan Basket Club and Nigeria.

Professional career
In 2015, Yahaya led Mark Mentors to the 2015 NPL title and emerged as the most valuable player of the competition.
In February 2019, Yahaya signed with Rivers Hoopers. In November 2019, Yahaya won the President Cup with Hoopers, being named Most Valuable Player on the way.

On 20 April 2020, Yahaya signed with Abidjan Basket Club in Ivory Coast.

National team career
As a player for Nigeria, Yahaya participated at the AfroBasket 2017.

3x3
Yahaya played 3x3 basketball at the 2018 FIBA 3x3 World Cup.

References

External links
 
 

1990 births
Living people
Nigerian men's basketball players
Sportspeople from Jos
Power forwards (basketball)
Rivers Hoopers players
Basketball players at the 2018 Commonwealth Games
African Games bronze medalists for Nigeria
African Games medalists in basketball
Competitors at the 2015 African Games
Kano Pillars BC players
Mark Mentors players
Abidjan Basket Club players
Commonwealth Games competitors for Nigeria
20th-century Nigerian people
21st-century Nigerian people